The 2003–04 National Division Three North was the fourth season (sixteenth overall) of the fourth division (north) of the English domestic rugby union competition using the name National Division Three North.  New teams to the division included Fylde and Kendal who were relegated from the 2002–03 National Division Two while promoted teams included Longton who came up as champions of Midlands Division 1 while Darlington (champions) and Macclesfield (playoffs) came up from North Division 1.  The league system was 2 points for a win and 1 point for a draw with the promotion system changing for this season with a playoff system being introduced.  The champions of both National Division Three North and National Division Three South would automatically go up but the runners up of these two divisions would meet each other in a one off match (at the home ground of the side with the superior league record) to see who would claim the third and final promotion place to National Division Two for the following season.

After two seasons spent in the division Waterloo would pip Halifax to the title by the narrowest of margins finishing dead level on points but going up to the 2004–05 National Division Two by virtue of a massively better for and against record.  Halifax would suffer a double disappointment by missing out on their second stab at promotion as they lost narrowly at home to 2003–04 National Division Three South runners up Launceston in the promotion playoff.  Relegated teams included newly promoted Longton (who gained only 4 points all season), Liverpool St Helens and Preston Grasshoppers.  Longton would drop back down to Midlands Division 1 while Liverpool St Helens and Preston Grasshoppers would fall to North Division 1.

Participating teams and locations

Final league table

Results

Round 1

Round 2

Round 3

Round 4 

Postponed.  Game rescheduled to 21 February 2004.

Postponed.  Game rescheduled to 21 February 2004.

Round 5

Round 6 

Postponed.  Game rescheduled to 6 March 2004.

Round 7

Round 8

Round 9

Round 10

Round 11

Round 12 

Postponed.  Game rescheduled to 24 April 2004.

Round 13

Round 14

Round 15

Round 16

Round 17 

Postponed.  Game rescheduled to 21 February 2004.

Round 18 

Postponed.  Game rescheduled to 1 May 2004.

Postponed.  Game rescheduled to 21 February 2004.

Postponed.  Game rescheduled to 21 February 2004.

Round 19

Round 20

Rounds 4, 17 & 18  (rescheduled games) 

Game rescheduled from 31 January 2004.

Game rescheduled from 18 October 2003.

Game rescheduled from 31 January 2004.

Game rescheduled from 24 January 2004.

Game rescheduled from 18 October 2003.

Round 21 

Postponed.  Game rescheduled to 6 March 2004.

Postponed.  Game rescheduled to 27 March 2004.

Game would initially be postponed but due to fixture congestion it would ultimately be cancelled.

Rounds 6 & 21 (rescheduled games) 

Game rescheduled from 28 February 2004.

Game rescheduled from 1 November 2003.

Round 22

Round 23

Round 21 (rescheduled game) 

Game rescheduled from 28 February 2004.

Round 24

Round 25

Round 26 

Postponed.  Game rescheduled to 8 May 2004.

Round 12 (rescheduled game) 

Game rescheduled from 13 December 2003.

Round 18 (rescheduled game) 

Game rescheduled from 31 January 2004.

Round 26 (rescheduled game) 

Game rescheduled from 17 April 2004.

Promotion play-off
The league runners up of National Division Three South and North would meet in a playoff game for promotion to National Division Two.  Halifax were the northern divisions runners up and as they had a superior league record than southern runners-up, Launceston, they hosted the play-off match.

Total season attendances

Individual statistics 

 Note that points scorers includes tries as well as conversions, penalties and drop goals.

Top points scorers

Top try scorers

Season records

Team
Largest home win — 91 pts
91 - 5 Waterloo at home to Preston Grasshoppers on 28 February 2004
Largest away win — 50 pts
53 - 3 Waterloo away to Fylde on 17 January 2004
Most points scored — 91 pts
91 - 5 Waterloo at home to Preston Grasshoppers on 28 February 2004
Most tries in a match — 14 
Waterloo at home to Preston Grasshoppers on 28 February 2004
Most conversions in a match — 9
Waterloo at home to Preston Grasshoppers on 28 February 2004
Most penalties in a match — 7
New Brighton at home to Preston Grasshoppers on 13 September 2003
Most drop goals in a match — 2 (x2)
Longton at home to Fylde on 8 November 2003
Fylde away to Halifax on 24 January 2004

Player
Most points in a match — 29
 Alistair J Murray for Tynedale at home to Longton on 18 October 2003
Most tries in a match — 4
 Jamie Bloem for Halifax at home to Darlington on 13 December 2003
Most conversions in a match — 9
 John Broxson for Waterloo at home to Preston Grasshoppers on 28 February 2004
Most penalties in a match — 7
 Anthony Birley for New Brighton at home to Preston Grasshoppers on 13 September 2003
Most drop goals in a match — 2 
 Mike Scott for Fylde away to Halifax on 24 January 2004

Attendances
Highest — 1,500  
Halifax at home to Waterloo on 10 April 2004
Lowest — 120   
Blaydon at home to Darlington on 10 April 2004
Highest Average Attendance —  N/A 
Lowest Average Attendance — N/A

See also
 English Rugby Union Leagues
 English rugby union system
 Rugby union in England

References

External links
 NCA Rugby

2003-04
2003–04 in English rugby union leagues